Kaushalya Fernando, is a Sri Lankan actress, director, producer and a civil activist. Highly versatile actress who dominated stage drama and cinema, Fernando is a five-time winner of the prestigious best actress award at the State Drama festival. She is the daughter of popular theatre director late Somalatha Subasinghe.

Personal life
Kaushalya was born as the daughter of Lionel Fernando and Somalatha Subasinghe. Her father Lionel was a civil servant and former ambassador. Her mother Somalatha is a well-known dramatist and a theatre director. She has one sister. Her grandparents were teachers and lived in Veyangoda. She went to four schools, first Anula College, then Gothami Balika Vidyalaya and Sujatha College, finally St. Paul's Girls School, Milagiriya. Besides arts, she is an athletic champion, competing at the 100, 200 and high jump events at the district levels. She graduated from University of Colombo with an arts degree. At that time, she was invited to join the department as a trainee English instructor by Prof. Siromi Fernando. She accepted it and then continued with a postgraduate diploma in English language teaching. She left the profession as a permanent staff member in 1999 and continued as a visiting lecturer.

She is married to Dr. Chandana Aluthge and is a mother to twins, Haimi and Hans. Her husband is working at the University of Colombo at the Department of Economics.

Acting career
She had the talent for theater from childhood, where she first wrote and directed stage plays at the age of 8 with the encouragement of her teacher, Sunethra Sarachchandra.

In 1979, Fernando experienced her first-ever stage role by accident as a last minute replacement in drama Punchi Apata Dang Therei directed by her mother and then a minor role in Vikurthi. Her major break though was Sugathapala de Silva's play Marasad. For her role in the play, she won special acclaim at the State Drama Festival. This influenced other renowned directors such as Dharmasiri Bandaranayake, K.B. Herath, Ranjini Obeysekera and Premasiri Khemadasa to identify Kaushalya's abilities. In 1994 she acted in the play Antigony produced by her mother, where Kaushalya won the Best Actress award at the 1995 State Drama Festival. In 1995, she acted in the play Dona Kathirina. Her performance in this role was commended for winning the Best Actress award at the 1996 State Drama Festival.

In 2005 and 2009, she became one of handful of Sri Lankan artists to walk on the red carpet at the Mecca of world cinema - the Cannes Film Festival 2005 and 66th Venice Film Festival in 2009.

She has acted few television dramas, however, they become some memorable hits in Sri Lankan teledrama history. The serial Dunhinda Addara is her first acting teledrama. Later she acted in a number of teledramas including Diyaketa Pahana, Wanaspahti, Isuru Gira, Sedona and Thaththa. For the role in Dunhida Addara, she won the OCIC Best Actress Award as well.

Selected stage dramas
 Punchi Apata Dang Therei
 Sanda Langa Maranaya 
 Moodu Puththu 
 Dhawala Bheeshana
 Marasad
 Bernardage Sipiri Geya 
 Vikurthi
 Kalumaali
 Acid Wessa
 Rahas Udaviya

Beyond acting
Fernando and his husband currently work with the Playhouse for Children and Youth founded by her mother in 1981. This organization was later incorporated in the Parliament of Sri Lanka as Lanka Children's and Youth Theatre Foundation, Act No 3 of 2007. She was also worked as a lecturer on Drama and Arts at University of Performing Arts, Colombo and as an English teacher at the University of Sri Jayawardenepura. Kaushalya along with her husband produced a stage play for children, titled Walas Paula, written by her mother.

She has produced three theater dramas up to 2019. They are, Sanda Langa Maranaya, Maask and Dutu Thena Allanu. Sanda Langa Maranaya is an adaptation from Garcia Lorca’s ‘Blood Wedding’. Maask is an adaptation of Henrik Ibsen’s ‘The Public Enemy', whereas Dutu Thena Allanu is an adaptation of Wole Soyinka's ‘Opera Wonyosi’.

She is a clever sitarist, and studied Indian classical singing, Kandyan and Low Country dance forms.

On 31 January 2019, Minister Mangala Samaraweera appointed a committee to initiate action to transform state media institutions to public broadcasting and television services, where Kaushalya was appointed as a member of that committee. However, on 28 February 2019, she resigned with three others from their respective positions.

Awards and Accolades
 Sarasaviya Awards Best Supporting Actress – Sulanga Enu Pinisa - 2006
 Rotterdam Film Festival Tiger Award – Flying fish competed - 2011 
 47th Chicago International Film Festival – Flying fish screened - 2011
 Under Contemporary Asian Film series – Flying fish screened at the Museum of Modern Arts in New York from July 7 – 13, 2011 - 
 Derana Film Awards Best Actress – Bora Diya Pokuna - 2016
 SAARC Film Festival Best Actress – Bora Diya Pokuna - 2016
 52nd Pesaro International Film Festival – Special Jury Mention - Puthekuta - 2016
 Hiru Golden Film Awards Best Actress – Bora Diya Pokuna - 2016

Filmography
Her first cinematic acting came through Asoka Handagama's Sanda Dadayama in 1996, however it is not yet screened in theaters. She rose to prominence and critically acclaimed through the films such as Sulanga Enu Pinisa, Bora Diya Pokuna and Akasa Kusum.

References

External links
 
 Kaushalya on Celeb Chat
 Women take strong stand for children and country
 Theatre on criminalised police and politics
 Opening a pathway for aspiring actors
 Somalatha Subasinghe film festival
 Interview with Kaushalya and Chandani
 For the youth, of the youth and by the youth

Living people
Sri Lankan television actresses
Sri Lankan film actresses
Year of birth missing (living people)